Luis Miguel Ramis Monfort (born 25 July 1970) is a Spanish retired professional footballer who played mainly as a central defender, currently manager of CD Tenerife.

He amassed La Liga totals of 165 matches and eight goals over nine seasons, mainly in representation of Deportivo (three and a half years), Real Madrid and Tenerife (two apiece).

Playing career
Born in Tarragona, Catalonia, Ramis started his career with hometown club Gimnàstic de Tarragona and, already in his 20s, joined Real Madrid's reserves. In 1992–93 he managed seven La Liga appearances with the main squad, being definitely promoted the following season.

In the 1994 Iberoamerican Cup, Ramis appeared in the second leg against Boca Juniors as a substitute, in a 2–1 loss in Buenos Aires (4–3 aggregate win). Shortly after, he moved to CD Tenerife as part of the deal involving Fernando Redondo and, after two solid top-flight campaigns, signed with fellow league side Sevilla FC, playing a career-best 39 matches albeit in a final relegation.

Ramis moved to firmly established Deportivo de La Coruña in 1997–98, initially acting as backup to Noureddine Naybet. After a relatively good first year, his career was severely marred by a double anterior cruciate ligament/fibula injury from which he never fully recovered; in his last professional years after leaving Depor, he totalled only 45 games as all his teams were relegated (Racing de Santander in the top division, Gimnàstic and Racing de Ferrol in Segunda División).

Coaching career
Ramis retired from the game in 2006, after three years in the Tercera División. His first steps in coaching (as assistant first) were spent in Real Madrid's youth categories.

On 5 January 2016, after Zinedine Zidane was promoted to the first team following the sacking of Rafael Benítez, Ramis was appointed as head coach of Real Madrid Castilla. After failing to promote his team in the playoffs, he left his post by mutual consent.

Ramis became UD Almería's second manager of the division two season on 14 March 2017. On 12 November, after eight matches without a win, he was relieved of his duties.

On 24 June 2018, Ramis signed as manager of second-tier club Albacete Balompié. He led them to fourth place in his first season, losing 2–1 on aggregate to RCD Mallorca in the playoff semi-finals. 

On 3 February 2020, Ramis was dismissed with the team now in the relegation zone with three points from their last nine games, and following elimination from the Copa del Rey by lowly UD Ibiza. On 24 November, he returned to Tenerife also in the second division.

Managerial statistics

Honours

Player
Supercopa de España: 1993

Copa Iberoamericana: 1994

Deportivo
La Liga: 1999–2000

Manager
Real Madrid B
Segunda División B: 2015–16

References

External links

1970 births
Living people
Sportspeople from Tarragona
Spanish footballers
Footballers from Catalonia
Association football defenders
La Liga players
Segunda División players
Segunda División B players
Tercera División players
Gimnàstic de Tarragona footballers
Real Madrid Castilla footballers
Real Madrid CF players
CD Tenerife players
Sevilla FC players
Deportivo de La Coruña players
Racing de Santander players
Racing de Ferrol footballers
UD San Sebastián de los Reyes players
Spanish football managers
Segunda División managers
Segunda División B managers
Real Madrid Castilla managers
UD Almería managers
Albacete Balompié managers
CD Tenerife managers